Osgoode Township High School is an Ottawa-Carleton District School Board high school in Ottawa, Ontario, Canada. It is located in the rural town of Metcalfe. The school was opened in 1920 as part of the Carleton Board of Education. It joined the new OCDSB in 1944 when the Carleton Board of Education merged with the Ottawa Board of Education. The school's motto 'Semper d altiora nitamur' means 'Always, we strive for higher'.

Catchment area
The student body is drawn from the communities of Metcalfe, Greely, Osgoode, Carlsbad, Vernon, Edwards, Kenmore, portions of Manotick and the area surrounding these communities.

Extra curricular
There is a strong music program at OTHS. The school has both a concert and a Jazz band and allows students to join for pleasure or to earn academic credits.

Despite it small size, the school has a strong athletics program. It has had successful ventures in both boys and girls curling, girls basketball and hockey, jr. girl's touch football, rowing, track, girls rugby, and boys rugby, bringing several teams to OFSAA in recent years. The famous hockey player and coach Larry Robinson attended OTHS in the 1960s.

The school's primary sports teams are known as the "Panthers".

Programs offered
In addition to the regular English Ontario school curriculum, OTHS also offers: 
 Cooperative Education
 Composite High School
 Late French Immersion
 Ontario Youth Apprenticeship Program

See also
List of high schools in Ontario
Communities
Greely (pop. 4,395)
Osgoode (pop. 2,784)
Metcalfe (pop. 2,070)
Carlsbad Springs (pop. ?)
Vernon (pop. 597)
Edwards (pop. 402)
Kenmore (pop. 321)
portions of Manotick

Population numbers are from the City of Ottawa 2004 estimates except for Edwards.

 City of Ottawa 2004 community estimates
 List of communities in the Ottawa area

External links
School Website
OCDSB Website
2006-2007 OCDSB School Profile
2005-2006 OCDSB School Profile
2004-2005 OCDSB School Profile

References 

High schools in Ottawa
Educational institutions established in 1954
1954 establishments in Ontario